The longstriped blenny (Parablennius rouxi) is a species of combtooth blenny found in the northeast Atlantic off Portugal, also known from the northern Mediterranean.  This species reaches a length of  TL. The identity of the person honoured by the specific name of this species was not specified but is thought to be the French painter and naturalist Jean Louis Florent Polydore Roux (1792-1833).

References

External links
 

longstriped blenny
Fauna of Portugal
Fish of the Mediterranean Sea
longstriped blenny